Edward Conner (1829–1900) was a member of the Wisconsin State Assembly.

Biography
Conner was born on February 3, 1829, in Steuben County, New York. He settled in Woodville, Wisconsin, in 1871.

Career
Conner was elected to the Assembly in 1888. Other positions he held include member of the county board of St. Croix County, Wisconsin, from 1880 to 1885. He was a Republican.

References

1829 births
1900 deaths
People from Steuben County, New York
People from St. Croix County, Wisconsin
County supervisors in Wisconsin
Republican Party members of the Wisconsin State Assembly
19th-century American politicians